Cybele is a genus of trilobites in the order Phacopida, that existed during the middle Ordovician in what is now Sweden. It was described by Loven in 1846, and the type species is Cybele bellatula, which was originally described dubiously under the genus Calymene by Dalman in 1827. The type locality was in Östergötland.

References

Ordovician trilobites of Europe
Encrinuridae genera
Paleozoic life of Quebec